Diego Miruelo, was an explorer and pilot who explored Florida's west coast in 1516. He may have been the first European to sail into Pensacola Bay. 

In 1516, he arrived to Florida from Cuba with one vessel  and explored the west coast of the peninsula, reaching the Apalachee Bay, named after his trip Miruelo bay. In Florida, he exchanged a few things of glass and steel for gold and silver collected by the Amerindians from the remains of wrecks in Florida.   So, he  mapped  Pensacola Bay. 

After that, he returned to Cuba. Due to failing to take note in the course of latitudes traveled for him and not remember them, he was unable to show the way to Florida on a second trip and he went insane.

References

Spanish explorers
Explorers of Spanish Florida